Wyandot Point is a rock point 3 nautical miles (6 km) west-southwest of Cape Tennyson on the north side of Ross Island. In association with the names of expedition ships grouped on this island, named after USNS Wyandot, a transport ship that carried supplies to this area in at least 13 seasons, 1955–56 to 1971–72.

Headlands of Ross Island